Cyprus participated in the Eurovision Song Contest 2008 with the song "Femme Fatale" written by Nikos Evagelou and Vangelis Evangelou. The song was performed by Evdokia Kadi. The Cypriot broadcaster Cyprus Broadcasting Corporation (CyBC) organised the national final A Song for Europe in order to select the Cypriot entry for the 2008 contest in Belgrade, Serbia. The national final featured ten entries, resulting in the selection of Kadi with "Femme Fatale" at the final on 12 January 2008.

Cyprus was drawn to compete in the second semi-final of the Eurovision Song Contest which took place on 22 May 2008. Performing during the show in position 17, "Femme Fatale" was not announced among the 10 qualifying entries of the second semi-final and therefore did not qualify to compete in the final. It was later revealed that Cyprus placed fifteenth out of the 19 participating countries in the semi-final with 36 points.

Background

Prior to the 2008 contest, Cyprus had participated in the Eurovision Song Contest twenty-five times since their debut in the 1981 contest. Its best placing was fifth, which it achieved three times: in the 1982 competition with the song "Mono i agapi" performed by Anna Vissi, in the 1997 edition with "Mana mou" performed by Hara and Andreas Constantinou, and the 2004 contest with "Stronger Every Minute" performed by Lisa Andreas. Cyprus' least successful result was in the 1986 contest when it placed last with the song "Tora zo" by Elpida, receiving only four points in total. However, its worst finish in terms of points received was when it placed second to last in the 1999 contest with "Tha'nai erotas" by Marlain Angelidou, receiving only two points.

The Cypriot national broadcaster, Cyprus Broadcasting Corporation (CyBC), broadcasts the event within Cyprus and organises the selection process for the nation's entry. CyBC confirmed their intentions to participate at the 2008 Eurovision Song Contest on 28 September 2007. Cyprus has used various methods to select the Cypriot entry in the past, such as internal selections and televised national finals to choose the performer, song or both to compete at Eurovision. The broadcaster selected the 2007 Cypriot entry via an internal selection. However, CyBC opted to organised a national final to select the Cypriot entry for the 2008 contest.

Before Eurovision

A Song for Europe 
A Song for Europe was the national final format developed by CyBC in order to select Cyprus' entry for the Eurovision Song Contest 2008. The competition took place on 12 January 2008 at the CyBC Studio 3 in Nicosia, hosted by Andreas Ektoras and broadcast on RIK 1, RIK Sat, Trito Programma, London Greek Radio as well as online via the broadcaster's website cybc.cy and the official Eurovision Song Contest website eurovision.tv.

Competing entries 
Artists and composers were able to submit their entries to the broadcaster between 29 September 2007 and 15 November 2007. All artists and songwriters were required to have Cypriot nationality, origin or residency as of 2007. At the conclusion of the deadline, 67 entries were received by CyBC. A seven-member selection committee selected 10 entries from the received submissions, which were announced on 8 December 2007. Among the competing artists was 1999 Cypriot Eurovision entrant Marlain Angelidou. Mike Connaris composed the Cypriot Eurovision entry in 2004.

Final 
The final took place on 12 January 2008. Ten entries competed and the winner, "Femme Fatale" performed by Evdokia Kadi, was selected by a combination of votes from a nine-member jury panel (40%) and a public televote (60%). The jury panel consisted of the seven members of the selection committee that selected the competing entries as well as two guest jurors. In addition to the performances of the competing entries, the show featured a guest performance by 1992, 1994 and 2007 Cypriot Eurovision entrant Evridiki and Dimitris Korgialas.

Promotion 
Evdokia Kadi specifically promoted "Femme Fatale" as the Cypriot Eurovision entry on 27 February 2008 by performing the song during the Greek Eurovision national final Ellinikós Telikós 2008.

At Eurovision

It was announced in September 2007 that the competition's format would be expanded to two semi-finals in 2008. According to Eurovision rules, all nations with the exceptions of the host country and the "Big Four" (France, Germany, Spain and the United Kingdom) are required to qualify from one of two semi-finals in order to compete for the final; the top nine songs from each semi-final as determined by televoting progress to the final, and a tenth was determined by back-up juries. The European Broadcasting Union (EBU) split up the competing countries into six different pots based on voting patterns from previous contests, with countries with favourable voting histories put into the same pot. On 28 January 2008, a special allocation draw was held which placed each country into one of the two semi-finals. Cyprus was placed into the second semi-final, to be held on 22 May 2008. The running order for the semi-finals was decided through another draw on 17 March 2008 and Cyprus was set to perform in position 17, following the entry from Malta and before the entry from Macedonia.

The two semi-finals and the final were broadcast in Cyprus on RIK 1 and RIK SAT with commentary by Melina Karageorgiou. The Cypriot spokesperson, who announced the Cypriot votes during the final, was Hristina Marouhou.

Semi-final 

Evdokia Kadi took part in technical rehearsals on 14 and 18 May, followed by dress rehearsals on 21 and 22 May. The Cypriot performance featured Kadi wearing a high-collared silver dress that was removed to reveal a short orange and black dress, joined by four backing vocalists dressed in black suits. The performance featured Kadi performing on and around a black dining table, which was popped up to reveal a red tablecloth towards the end of the song, on which Kadi sat on while the backing vocalists lifted the table and carried it around. The backing vocalists that joined Kadi on stage were Andreas Vanezis, Christos Shakallis, Polys Kourousides and Tefkros Neokleous. An additional backing vocalist, Pavlos Gregoras, was featured for the performance.

At the end of the show, Cyprus was not announced among the top 10 entries in the second semi-final and therefore failed to qualify to compete in the final. It was later revealed that Cyprus placed fifteenth in the semi-final, receiving a total of 36 points.

Voting 
Below is a breakdown of points awarded to Cyprus and awarded by Cyprus in the second semi-final and grand final of the contest. The nation awarded its 12 points to Georgia in the semi-final and to Greece in the final of the contest.

Points awarded to Cyprus

Points awarded by Cyprus

References

2008
Countries in the Eurovision Song Contest 2008
Eurovision